Scott David Aukerman (29) (born July 2) is an American writer, actor, comedian, television personality, director, producer, and podcast host. Starting as a writer and performer in the later seasons of the sketch series Mr. Show, Aukerman is best-known as the host of the weekly comedy podcast Comedy Bang! Bang! as well as the IFC original television series of the same name. Aukerman is the co-creator of Between Two Ferns with Zach Galifianakis and co-founder of the Earwolf podcast network.

Early life
Aukerman was born in Savannah, Georgia to Burt and Linda Aukerman. He grew up in Orange County, California, attending Cypress High School and the Orange County School of the Arts, studying acting and musical theater and writing plays in his spare time. Aukerman was raised in a religiously observant household, attending a Baptist church three times a week until college. He hosted a public-access television show called Centurion Highlights, based on the school's mascot. In a 2015 interview, Aukerman said "I'm still doing that same show, just with celebrities instead of my high school cafeteria." He started a short-lived band, The Naked Postmen, with Adrian Young, who went on to be the drummer for No Doubt.

While attending Orange Coast College in Costa Mesa, he and fellow student B. J. Porter began writing together when they were both scripting and performing in a radio show called Lutz Radio.

Career
After a brief period studying at the Pacific Conservatory of the Performing Arts and touring the country as a musical theater actor, in 1995, at the request of his friends, Aukerman and Porter started performing at The Comedy Store in Los Angeles under the moniker "The Fun Bunch", a name meant to parody improvisation groups at the time.

Mr. Show co-creator Bob Odenkirk was in the audience for the second performance, and soon tapped the duo to write for and occasionally perform on the show in its fourth season. This led to an Emmy nomination in 1999 for Aukerman and the rest of the staff. Aukerman appeared sporadically on the show, most notably as the model Theo Brixton in the Taint Magazine sketch.

After the show's cancellation, Aukerman and Porter segued into writing film and television scripts, most notably Run Ronnie Run! and the first draft of the film Tenacious D in The Pick of Destiny. In 2004, he and Porter received an "Additional Dialogue" credit on the animated feature film Shark Tale. They went on to write an unproduced script for the sequel, as well as an unproduced Shrek spin-off film based on the character Puss in Boots. In 2007, a feature film script he wrote with Porter and Odenkirk, titled Kanan Rhodes: Unkillable Servant of Justice, was purchased by MTV Films with the intent of starring Rainn Wilson, although it currently remains unproduced. Also in 2007, Aukerman released a self-described "joke record", Scott Aukerman's Koo Koo Roo's Greatest Hits, which featured Aukerman and Sarah Silverman Program writer Jon Schroeder shouting over current soft-rock hits. This was put out in limited release on AST Records.

In 2009, Aukerman and Porter wrote a pilot script for NBC, titled Privates. The network ultimately passed on the show. That year, Aukerman took on the role as head writer for the 2009 MTV Movie Awards and executive produced and co-wrote a pilot for Comedy Central, The New Andy Dick Show. The network ultimately passed on ordering it to series.

In 2010, Aukerman wrote a feature film script for friend Zach Galifianakis for Fox, and he and Patton Oswalt co-wrote a television pilot for Fox, which the network ultimately passed on. Later that year, Aukerman joined a "writers lab", writing film scripts for Imagine Entertainment.

Comedy Death-Ray/Comedy Bang! Bang!

In 2002, Aukerman and Porter started the successful alternative comedy showcase Comedy Death-Ray, which ran Tuesday night at the M Bar in Los Angeles. Porter had friends in common with M Bar owner Joe Reynolds, and visited the bar shortly after its opening. Upon seeing how empty M Bar was, Porter convinced Reynolds to let him start a comedy show to help business. The show eventually moved to the Upright Citizens Brigade Theatre in 2005 to gain more creative freedom. A Comedy Death-Ray CD taped partially in San Francisco at the SF Sketchfest and partially at their fourth-anniversary, all-night show in LA was released on Comedy Central Records on September 11, 2007. The CD featured Aukerman, comedians David Cross, Patton Oswalt, Paul F. Tompkins, and other CDR regulars.

In 2007, Aukerman and Porter produced several internet shorts with Comedy Death-Ray comedians for the internet site Super Deluxe. These included three episodes of The Brody Stevens Interview Challenge, and two episodes of Lake Charles Lake, in which he also co-starred. They made more shorts in 2008, but the site was shut down and folded into Adult Swim before they could air.

In 2007, Aukerman and B. J. Porter created and produced a sketch pilot, titled The Right Now! Show, based on their show for Fox.  However, the network passed on ordering it to series in late 2007. Cast member Casey Wilson was immediately hired as a featured cast member of Saturday Night Live after the news. A short film made for the show, Between Two Ferns with Zach Galifianakis, eventually moved to internet site Funny Or Die, becoming one of its most successful series.

Starting January 3, 2011, Aukerman became the host of a series of interview interstitials, titled Comedy Death-Ray, airing three nights a week on the IFC network, where he interviews stars and creators of shows that the network runs, including The Ben Stiller Show, The Larry Sanders Show, Mr. Show, Freaks & Geeks, Undeclared, and Arrested Development.

In 2011, Aukerman and Porter parted ways, and the Comedy Death-Ray live show was renamed Comedy Bang! Bang! The Comedy Bang! Bang! live show ultimately ended in December 2012 after ten years.

Comedy Bang! Bang!: The Podcast

Being a frequent guest on and admirer of the award-winning podcast Never Not Funny with Jimmy Pardo led Aukerman to the decision that he should start his own comedy podcast. On May 1, 2009, Aukerman started to host Comedy Death-Ray Radio, a comedy-themed broadcast based upon the live show, on Los Angeles radio station Indie 103.1. The show continued to air on Fridays at 12 noon Pacific but moved to being distributed by the Earwolf podcasting network in 2010.  The podcast of each show is available weekly on iTunes and the Earwolf website and has been downloaded several million times.

Aukerman hosts, with frequent guest collaborators Paul F. Tompkins, Lauren Lapkus, Neil Campbell, Mike Hanford, James Adomian, Nick Kroll, Andy Daly, and the late Harris Wittels among others, serving as guests and characters. Entertainment Weekly called the show "often strange, consistently hilarious, always unpredictable," and The A.V. Club named it one of 2010's "Best Podcasts." In May 2011, Aukerman renamed the show Comedy Bang! Bang! On December 4, 2013, The A.V. Club named Comedy Bang! Bang! the best podcast of 2013. In 2018, Time Magazine named Comedy Bang! Bang! one of The 50 Best Podcasts to Listen to Right Now.

On June 8, 2012 IFC premiered the television series Comedy Bang! Bang!, hosted by Aukerman. On December 2, 2016, the series ended after five seasons and 110 episodes.

In 2021, Aukerman launched Comedy Bang Bang World, a subscription service independent from Earwolf that includes ad-free access to the podcast's full archives, the live shows, archives to other programs like Threedom and The Andy Daly Podcast Project, and exclusive podcasts like CBB Presents and Scott Hasn't Seen. Earwolf still distributes the free ad-supported versions of Comedy Bang! Bang! and Threedom.

Between Two Ferns with Zach Galifianakis

One sketch from Aukerman and Porter's sketch show The Right Now! Show, Between Two Ferns with Zach Galifianakis, was put up on internet site Funny Or Die and received several hundreds of thousands of hits in just a few days.

This was followed by Ferns interviews with talk-show host Jimmy Kimmel, Mad Men star Jon Hamm, Natalie Portman, Bradley Cooper, Charlize Theron, Conan O'Brien, Ben Stiller, Steve Carell, Sean Penn, Bruce Willis, Jennifer Aniston, Will Ferrell, "Oscar Buzz Edition" (featuring Jennifer Lawrence, Christoph Waltz, Naomi Watts, Amy Adams, Anne Hathaway, Jessica Chastain, Sally Field and Bradley Cooper), a collaboration video with The Lonely Island and James Franco, and a "Happy Holidays Edition" featuring Samuel L. Jackson, Tobey Maguire and Arcade Fire. Aukerman directed the Theron, O'Brien, Penn, Willis, Ferrell, "Oscar Buzz," Bieber, Franco & "Happy Holidays Edition" episodes.

In March 2014, an episode was released with President Barack Obama. It was designed to bring attention to the Affordable Care Act. Galifianakis engaged in his regular insult comedy style of interviewing, which the President reciprocated throughout the interview. Within 24 hours, the video of this interview had amassed upwards of 14 million views. Aukerman directed and produced this episode, which won the 2014 Emmy Award for Outstanding Short-Format Live-Action Entertainment Program.

Each episode has been viewed millions of times, and the President Barack Obama, Hillary Clinton, Justin Bieber, Brad Pitt, and Natalie Portman episodes have become some of Funny Or Die's most popular videos ever.

In 2015, Aukerman won the Primetime Emmy Award for Outstanding Short-Format Live-Action Entertainment Program again, this time for the Brad Pitt episode.

Earwolf

In 2010, based upon the success of his podcast, Aukerman, along with Jeff Ullrich, started the Earwolf network, eventually producing and releasing several podcasts. In 2011, they announced a partnership with Funny Or Die. In 2014, they launched a sister network Wolfpop, under the curation of comedian Paul Scheer. On March 7, 2016, the majority of Wolfpop's programs were folded over into Earwolf.

Podcasts with Adam Scott

In 2014, Aukerman started a limited-run podcast with actor Adam Scott called U Talkin' U2 To Me?, ostensibly devoted to the career and discography of the band U2. Most episodes combined discussion of the band with running gags and comedy bits only marginally related to the band. The podcast ultimately led to Aukerman and Scott interviewing the band themselves, as well as being invited to see them live. The podcast largely concluded following a review of Songs of Experience in 2017.

In 2018, Aukerman and Scott started a continuation of the podcast called R U Talkin' R.E.M. RE: ME?, focused on the band R.E.M. This podcast also led to Aukerman and Scott interviewing members of the band, such as Michael Stipe and Mike Mills, as well as a guest appearance from Peter Buck at a live episode for Clusterfest.

2020 saw the pair create a one-off version of the show, Youey Talkin' Huey 2ey Me?, with special guests Huey Lewis and Jimmy Kimmel. The episode was dedicated to the music of Huey Lewis and the News, to promote the band's new album Weather.

Aukerman and Scott began a new podcast in July 2020, R U Talkin' RHCP RE: Me? The podcast's intention was to cover the music of the Red Hot Chili Peppers. This format, however, was abandoned in the show's second episode. Instead, the duo chose to focus on Talking Heads, changing the podcast name to U Talkin' Talking Heads 2 My Talking Head.

Artistry
Aukerman's work has been described as "gloriously silly," and "masterful comedy and improvisation." Although Tom Lennon's first reaction to the initial episode of Comedy Bang Bang was "no one’s going to listen to this," Aukerman has since been lauded as the ringleader of a podcast that is, according to Vulture, "a consistent circus of experimentation by some of comedy’s most creative minds." His influence on contemporary comedy, by way of highlighting emerging talent, has earned him the title of "the alternative Lorne Michaels."

Personal life

Since 2008, Aukerman has been married to Kulap Vilaysack. The couple had a dog named Rocky, who died in 2016. They now have two dogs named Georgia Michaela and Molly Ringwald. Aukerman is a stated longtime fan of comic books and has co-authored several titles, including X-Men and Secret Wars editions.  He previously collected DVDs, and is an avid filmgoer and fan of cinema venues. In 2022 Aukerman and Vilaysack had a daughter, Emerald.

Work

Film

Television

Podcasts
Comedy Bang! Bang! (2009–present), host
Analyze Phish (2011–2014), co-host
U Talkin' U2 To Me? (2014–2018), co-host
R U Talkin' R.E.M. RE: Me? (2018–2020), co-host
U Talkin' Talking Heads 2 My Talking Head (2020), co-host
Threedom (2018–present), co-host
We Have To Stop Talking TMNT on CBB (2020), co-host
Scott Hasn't Seen (2021–present), co-host
CBB-FM (2021–present), host

Internet
Lake Charles Lake (2007), on Super Deluxe
The Fun Bunch (2008), on Super Deluxe
The Four Flop-Tops (2009), Funny Or Die video
Lost with Paul Scheer (2009), internet ARG for the TV show Lost
Sizzle Alert: LOST with Sarah Silverman (2010), Funny Or Die video

Discography

Albums 
Studio
2007: Scott Aukerman's Koo Koo Roo's Greatest Hits
2008: Never Not Christmas - A Holiday E.P. (with Jimmy Pardo)

Compilation
2007: Comedy Death-Ray
2009: Comedy By The Numbers
2009: Comedy Death-Ray Xmas CD 2009 (also executive producer)
2010: Comedy Death-Ray Xmas CD 2010 (also executive producer)

Other
2006: Brian Posehn - Live In: Nerd Rage (performs sketch with Brian Posehn and Bob Odenkirk)
2007: Eban Schletter's Witching Hour (sings the song "I've Created A Monster")
2008: R.O. Magic: The Best of R.O. Manse (as S.E. Duction)

Background Vocals
 "That's My Girl" by The Vandals; appears on Look What I Almost Stepped In...
 "Dirty White Boy" by The Vandals; unreleased
 "Heigh Ho" by The Vandals; appears on Mosh Pit On Disney, Japanese compilation album

Comic books
Writer
 Deadpool (2012) #45 (5-page backup story)
 Secret Wars Journal #3 (10-page story)
 Spider-Man/Deadpool #6
 X-Men: Black – Mojo #1

Awards and nominations

References

External links

1970 births
20th-century American male actors
21st-century American male actors
Actors from Savannah, Georgia
American sketch comedians
American male comedians
American male film actors
American male television actors
American podcasters
American television talk show hosts
American television writers
Comedians from California
Comedy film directors
Living people
American male television writers
Male actors from Georgia (U.S. state)
Orange Coast College alumni
Orange County School of the Arts alumni
Pacific Conservatory of the Performing Arts alumni
People from Cypress, California
Upright Citizens Brigade Theater performers
Writers from Savannah, Georgia
Screenwriters from California
Screenwriters from Georgia (U.S. state)
20th-century American comedians
21st-century American comedians